The Golden Thought  is a 1917 silent short film western directed by and starring Tom Mix. It was produced by the Selig Polyscope Company and released through the General Film Company. A print survives in the George Eastman House.

It was rereleased in 1924 after being expanded into feature form. It's unclear whether this expanded version survives.

Cast
 Tom Mix as Tom Daton
 Victoria Forde as Bess Jackson
 Barney Furey as Gene Hammond
 Lillian Clark as Estella Hammond (billed as Lily Clark)
 Sid Jordan as Doc Breede
 Pat Chrisman as Bill Blevins
 Lillian Wade

References

External links
 
 lobby poster
 larger version of lobby poster

1917 films
1917 Western (genre) films
1917 short films
American black-and-white films
Films directed by Tom Mix
Selig Polyscope Company films
Silent American Western (genre) films
1910s American films
1910s English-language films